José Manuel Camilo Silva was the tenth Mayor of the commune of Pichilemu, office which he held between May and July 1928.

Political career
He was appointed mayor of the junta de vecinos (neighbors' council) of Pichilemu by decree of President Carlos Ibáñez del Campo following Evaristo Merino's resignation in May 1928. The municipal council was then composed by him and Isaías Reyes and Guillermo Greene Ortega as vocales. His term lasted until 10 July 1928.

References

Year of birth missing
Year of death missing
Mayors of Pichilemu